This is a list of present and past ministers for education in Ghana.

List of ministers

See also
Ministry of Education (Ghana)

References

Politics of Ghana
Education